Badas may refer to:
Bowel-associated dermatosis–arthritis syndrome or BADAS
Badas Forest Reserve in Belait District, Brunei
Badas (Inam), a village in Karnataka, India
Badas (K.H.), a village in Karnataka, India
Badas, Kediri, a kecamatan (district) in East Java Province, Indonesia
Badas Islands, a group of islands in Riau Islands Province, Indonesia
 Kostas Badas (born 1976), Greek footballer

See also 
 Badass (disambiguation)